Mümtaz Tahincioğlu (born 1952 in Mardin, Turkey) is a former racing car driver and long-time president of the Turkish Motorsports Federation (TOSFED), FIA Council Member, and served as the secretary general of the sports club Galatasaray S.K.

Tahincioğlu lived in England between 1968 and 1989. He won the Turkish Karting Championship three times between 1989 and 1992 prior to racing in the World Karting Championships for Turkey. He competed in the first edition of Turkish Formula Three Championship in 1994.

Tahincioglu was president of the Turkish Motorsports Federation (TOSFED) between 1997 and 2012, succeeded by Demir Berberoğlu. He is the father of Jason Tahincioglu, a former Formula Three pilot and GP2 FMS International driver in 2006 and 2007.

References

External links
Turkish Motorsports Federation Official Website
Galatasaray Sports Club Official Website

1952 births
People from Mardin
Living people
Turkish emigrants to the United Kingdom
Turkish racing drivers
Turkish Formula Three Championship drivers
Turkish referees and umpires